Brothers in Law is a 1957 British comedy film directed by Roy Boulting and starring Richard Attenborough, Ian Carmichael, Terry-Thomas and Jill Adams. The film is one of the Boulting brothers successful series of institutional satires that begun with Private's Progress in 1956. It is an adaptation of the 1955 novel Brothers in Law by Henry Cecil, a comedy set in the legal profession.

Plot summary
Roger Thursby has just completed his barrister's examinations and has been called to the bar. He commences his pupillage in the London chambers of Kendall Grimes, but finds he learns more from Henry, his fellow pupil, and Alec, the chambers clerk. Although only supposed to 'shadow' Grimes, he finds himself on his feet before unsympathetic judges almost immediately.

Roger and Henry vie for the affections of Sally, a fellow lodger. She obtains his first brief for him from her father, a solicitor. It is an undefended divorce case, which Roger manages to lose, to the lady's fury.

Roger slowly gains more confidence. He is given a 'dock brief', a case of fraud. Despite the odd behaviour of his client, Alfred Green, Roger gets him off. He also becomes the toast of his home town, when he appears in the local assizes court, and wins a case of slander, with his proud parents and their friends in the gallery.

Sally marries Charles, a stockbroker friend, but Roger and Henry perk up with the arrival of two attractive girls as fellow lodgers.

Main cast
 Richard Attenborough as Henry Marshall 
 Ian Carmichael as Roger Thursby 
 Terry-Thomas as Alfred Green 
 Jill Adams as Sally Smith 
 Miles Malleson as Kendall Grimes 
 Raymond Huntley as Tatlock 
 Eric Barker as Alec Blair 
 Nicholas Parsons as Charles Poole 
 Kynaston Reeves as Judge Lawson 
 John Le Mesurier as Judge Ryman 
 Irene Handl as Mrs. Potter
 Olive Sloane as Mrs. Newent
 Edith Sharpe as Mrs. Thursby  
 Leslie Phillips as Shopkeeper  
 Brian Oulton as Client
 George Rose as Mark Frost
 Kenneth Griffith as Undertaker
 Basil Dignam as Judge Emery
 Henry Longhurst as Reverend Arthur Thursby
 Penny Morrell as Rosalie Biddle
 John Schlesinger as Assize Court Solicitor

Critical reception
Bosley Crowther in The New York Times compared the film unfavourably to Private's Progress, commenting that it was "blessed with little spark"; whereas more recently, Tony Sloman in the Radio Times wrote, "Carmichael is surrounded here by a cast of accomplished character actors, including the splendid Terry-Thomas and the redoubtable Richard Attenborough as a smarmy fellow barrister. This is still very funny and relevant today."

Box office
According to Kinematograph Weekly the film was "in the money" at the British box office in 1957.

References

Bibliography
 Harper, Sue & Porter, Vincent. British Cinema of the 1950s: The Decline of Deference. Oxford University Press, 2003.

External links

1957 films
1957 comedy films
1950s satirical films
British comedy films
British satirical films
1950s English-language films
Films directed by Roy Boulting
Films based on British novels
Films scored by Benjamin Frankel
Films shot at British National Studios
1950s British films